Niagara Falls Transit Terminal is located south of Bridge Street on Erie Avenue in Niagara Falls, Ontario, Canada, directly across from the Niagara Falls railway station.

Services

Local buses
 Niagara Falls Transit 
 102 Hospital
 104 Victoria Avenue
 108 Thorold Stone Road
 204 Victoria Avenue (Evenings, Sundays & Holidays)
 WEGO Green Line

Regional buses
 GO Transit
 12 Niagara Falls/Toronto to Burlington GO Station

Intercity buses
 Megabus/Coach Canada
 Toronto via St. Catharines
 Greyhound Lines
 Toronto - New York City

References

External links

Bus stations in Ontario
Transport in Niagara Falls, Ontario